Matt Faessler (born 21 December 1998 in Australia) is an Australian rugby union player who plays for the  in Super Rugby. His playing position is hooker. He was named in the Reds squad for the 2021 Super Rugby AU season.

Reference list

External links
Rugby.com.au profile
itsrugby.co.uk profile

1998 births
Australian rugby union players
Living people
Rugby union hookers
Queensland Country (NRC team) players
Queensland Reds players